Jonathan Grigg is a British professor of paediatric respiratory and environmental medicine at Queen Mary University of London. He is a former Research lead of the British Paediatric Respiratory Society and was a Vice Chair of the Royal  College of Physicians' working party on air pollution and authored the report "Every breath we take, the lifelong impact of air pollution".

He was Secretary of the Paediatric Assembly of the European Respiratory Society until 2017. In 2020 he became a Senior Investigator at the National Institute for Health and Care Research (NIHR).

Grigg has had various British media appearances including having been a participant in the Radio 4 program Costing the Earth, and an interview with Sky News regarding the RCP report.

Jonathan Grigg is a founding member of Doctors against Diesel, a group advocating the rapid phase out of the current fleet of diesel cars, vans, and taxis.

References

External links
Jonathan Grigg talking about child health.

Living people
20th-century British medical doctors
21st-century British medical doctors
Academics of Queen Mary University of London
Year of birth missing (living people)
British paediatricians
NIHR Senior Investigators
Air pollution in the United Kingdom